Newton St Loe SSSI is a geological Site of Special Scientific Interest (SSSI) close to the River Avon, near the village of Newton St Loe in Bath and North East Somerset. It was notified on September 1992.It is 2.26 hectares in size.

The site was featured in the Geological Conservation Review.

The site is designated as an SSSI because it represents the only remaining known exposure of fossiliferous Pleistocene gravels along the River Avon. In conjunction with other sites within the wider area, it has aided the development of a scientific understanding of the history of early glaciation within South West England.

Site description
The citation sheet for this SSSI describes the site as follows:
This site consists of a river terrace approximately 10m above the present River Avon. The Pleistocene fluvial gravels temporarily exposed at Newton St Loe exhibit scour-and-fill structures. The trough cross bedding is consistent with the gravels having been laid down by a braided river, a fluvial style usually associated with cold stage sedimentation. The provenance of there gravels is complex and they contain material from South Wales and Midland sources. The gravels were subsequently weathered and decalcified during interstadial episodes and cryoturbated under stadial conditions.

Reasons for notification
The bodies of mammoths (Mammuthus) and horses (Equus) have been found at the site. It was not possible to identify the species however, due to the poor state of the specimens.

Sources
 English Nature citation sheet for this SSSI (accessed 2006-07-07)

Kennet and Avon Canal
Sites of Special Scientific Interest in Avon
Sites of Special Scientific Interest notified in 1992